Black Candles (Spanish: Los ritos sexuales del diablo,  The Sexual Rites of the Devil) is a 1982 exploitation horror film directed by José Ramón Larraz and starring Helga Liné, Vanessa Hidalgo, Carmen Carrión and Jeffrey Healey.

Plot
Considered by many to be one of the most shocking and controversial Erotic Horror films of all time, Black Candles is about a young woman named Carol, who is drawn into a Satanic sex cult in England following the abrupt death of her brother. Everything starts off seemingly innocent but soon Carol finds herself more immersed into a sinister, sadistic world of debauchery, violence as well as utter depravity that she may never be able to escape from as the cult members' grip begins take hold onto her mind, body and soul. Will the woman be able to break free of their baleful restraints or will she be a prisoner of the sexual rights of the devil forever?

Cast

References

External links

1982 films
1982 horror films
Films directed by José Ramón Larraz
Spanish horror films
Spanish supernatural horror films
The Devil in film
1980s English-language films